The 2020 Orlando City SC season was the club's 10th season of existence in Orlando and sixth season as a Major League Soccer franchise, the top-flight league in the United States soccer league system. Due to the COVID-19 pandemic, the U.S. Open Cup was canceled.

Season review

Pre-season 
On October 7, 2019, one day after the final game of the 2019 season, Orlando City parted ways with head coach James O'Connor.

With the addition of Nashville SC and Inter Miami CF in 2020, MLS held an Expansion Draft on November 19, 2019. Orlando City had 13 players exposed. None were taken.

On November 21, 2019, it was announced that a total of 14 players would not return either because their contract had expired, they had their contract option declined or, in the case of Danilo Acosta, they returned to their parent club after their loan expired. Orlando City had an option to buy Acosta at the end of the loan but declined. However, Ruan had his purchase option exercised following his loan in 2019. Another notable departure was Cristian Higuita who had been the sole remaining member of the team's inaugural MLS roster in 2015 and departed as the club's leading appearance maker with 108 across all competitions. Having initially had their options declined, Uri Rosell, Alex DeJohn and Mason Stajduhar all later renegotiated new contracts with Orlando.

On December 4, 2019, Óscar Pareja was announced as Orlando City's new head coach. Pareja had previously worked with Orlando's VP of soccer operations Luiz Muzzi at FC Dallas.

Having emphasized the importance Homegrown players the previous offseason, Orlando signed the sixth and seventh Homegrown players in club history in December, signing David Loera following his junior year at NC State and Jordan Bender from USL affiliate Orlando City B.

The team also did a significant amount of recruiting in South America, bringing in Colombian midfielder Andrés Perea, Argentine defender Rodrigo Schlegel and Brazilian defender Antônio Carlos all on one-year loans from Atlético Nacional, Racing Club and Palmeiras respectively while Brazilian midfielder Júnior Urso joined permanently from Corinthians. Peruvian international goalkeeper Pedro Gallese also joined on a free having last played for Alianza Lima, on loan from Veracruz.

On January 9, Orlando made five selections in the 2020 MLS SuperDraft including one in the first round. Fifth-overall pick Daryl Dike was automatically signed due to his Generation Adidas status while Joey DeZart was later given a contract. Austin Aviza and Nick O'Callaghan were signed to Orlando City B.

On January 17, Orlando officially opened the new Orlando City SC Training Ground at Osceola Heritage Park.

February 
Orlando's sixth MLS campaign began at home to Real Salt Lake on February 29, a repeat of the 2016 season opener. Just like 2016, the game once again finished level, this time goalless as debutant goalkeeper Pedro Gallese kept Orlando's first clean sheet in nine games stretching back to the previous season. The result meant Orlando remained unbeaten on matchday one since joining MLS. The game was also notable for the substitute appearance of on loan Andrés Perea who became the first person born in the 21st century to play for Orlando City SC.

March 
March 7 saw Orlando's first away game of 2020. It ended in a 2–1 defeat to Colorado Rapids as Drew Moor headed a 90th-minute winner from a corner after substitute Chris Mueller had scored the team's first goal of the season to tie up the game in the 82nd minute. It was the first time Orlando had lost to Colorado in the two teams' six meetings.

COVID-19 pandemic 
On March 12 it was announced that the 2020 Major League Soccer season had been temporarily suspended for 30 days on the advice of public health authorities due to the COVID-19 pandemic. With the situation developing, the suspension was extended until at least June 8. On May 6, MLS allowed voluntary individual workouts on outdoor fields for the first time since the suspension. Every Orlando City player opted to train at the team's Kissimmee training facility.

MLS is Back Tournament 
On June 10, MLS announced a return to play via a one-off MLS is Back Tournament. The competition ran from July 8 to August 11 at the ESPN Wide World of Sports Complex. Orlando's first match was the tournament opener, scheduled against newly created Florida rivals Inter Miami CF. Orlando won the game 2–1 after trailing thanks to goals from Mueller with his second goal of the season and then a 90+7-minute winner from captain Nani in his first appearance of the year. In the second game Mueller scored twice in the opening ten minutes as Orlando earned back to back MLS wins for the first time since May 2018, running out 3–1 winners over New York City FC with Tesho Akindele also scoring his first goal of the season during the match. The result, coupled with Philadelphia Union beating Inter Miami later that evening, meant Orlando sealed qualification to the knockout round with a game to spare. A 1–1 draw against similarly already-qualified Philadelphia in the final group game, in which Mauricio Pereyra scored his first goal for the club, ensured Orlando finished top of Group A on goal difference.

Orlando faced Montreal Impact, who qualified as one of the best third-place teams, in the round of 16. Orlando won 1–0, earning their first shutout of the tournament and second of the season. The team progressed to the semi-final stage following a penalty shootout win over Los Angeles FC with the teams tied 1–1 after 90 minutes. Nani had a penalty saved by Kenneth Vermeer in the second half before Bradley Wright-Phillips opened the scoring shortly after. João Moutinho forced the shootout, scoring an equalizer against his former club off a Nani corner in the 90th minute, his first goal for Orlando City. Nani went on to score the decisive penalty in the 5–4 shootout victory with every Orlando player scoring their penalty. For the semi-final, Orlando City matched up against Minnesota United FC, coached by Adrian Heath who had led Orlando City's USL predecessor to two USL Pro titles and had remained unbeaten against the Lions in three previous meetings since his 2016 sacking. However, a first half Nani brace and a second half Benji Michel stoppage time goal earned Orlando a 3–1 win and booked their place in the final. Portland Timbers won the final 2–1. Nani, João Moutinho and Ruan were all later named to the tournament Best XI.

August
On August 19, following the return of the MLS regular season in home markets, Orlando City announced that all three phase one games at Exploria Stadium would be open to fans at a reduced capacity and that face coverings would be mandatory for those in attendance. They were one of only five teams (with Dallas, Montreal, Real Salt Lake and Sporting KC) to confirm fans could attend during phase one. Phase one consisted of Orlando playing three regional opponents both home and away: Inter Miami CF, Nashville SC and Atlanta United FC. The first of these was a 3–2 defeat away to Inter Miami on August 22, the new expansion franchise's first home match and subsequently their first victory having lost all five of their previous matches. It was also notable for the first senior career goal scored by Orlando's first-round rookie Daryl Dike. In the following game, Dike scored another two goals as Orlando won 3–1 in their first meeting with Nashville SC. The game was the first to kick off on August 26, with the other ten teams scheduled to play that evening later deciding to postpone in solidarity with sports teams from other leagues, including the NBA, WNBA and MLB, who refused to play in protest following the shooting of Jacob Blake on August 23. Three days later, Orlando traveled to Atlanta and earned their first ever win over their rivals when Urso opened the scoring with his first goal for the club. Mueller doubled Orlando's lead before the halftime break and while Brooks Lennon halved the lead in the 83rd minute, Nani immediately restored the cushion to help seal a 3–1 victory.

September
On September 2, Orlando traveled to Nashville, this time playing out a 1–1 draw with the expansion side when Nashville DP Randall Leal scored his first goal for the club to rescue a point for the hosts following Michel's first half rocket from outside the box which had opened the scoring. On September 5, Orlando's second matchup with Atlanta inside a week ended in a 1–1 draw after Adam Jahn scored a stoppage time equalizer. After playing five games in a 15-day stretch, Orlando had a full week break before the final phase one match on September 12: Miami's first visit to Exploria Stadium. Orlando won 2–1, ending Miami's club-record three game unbeaten streak in the process. The game included a dramatic series of officiating calls whereby referee Ismail Elfath awarded a penalty to Miami after consulting the video screen, sending Rodrigo Schlegel off for second yellow card on Julián Carranza in the process before both were rescinded after officials realized Carranza was offside, negating the play. With the conclusion of the phase one home and away series, Orlando hosted Chicago Fire FC on September 19, winning 4–1 and equaling the club record streak of six games unbeaten in regular season MLS play in the process. The record was broken on September 23 when Orlando beat Sporting Kansas City 2–1 thanks to first half goals from Akindele and Michel. Johnny Russell halved the home team's deficit early in the second half but the Lions held out to also maintain the club's 100% win record when leading by two goals in MLS history. On September 27, Pareja coached against FC Dallas for the first time since ending his five-year head coaching spell with the Texas club in November 2018. The game finished goalless with Orlando playing down a man from the 69th minute after Sebas Méndez became the first Lion to be sent off in 2020.

October
Orlando's first game of October saw the Lions play New York Red Bulls for the first time in 2020, a 3–1 home win that saw the first goal for the club by Antônio Carlos and the professional debut of homegrown player David Loera. With Gallese away on international duty, Brian Rowe made his first appearance of the season on October 7 as Orlando stretched the unbeaten run to 10 matches after a heavily rotated team played out a goalless draw away to Atlanta United. Orlando's game against Columbus Crew scheduled for October 11, which would have seen the Lions play an Eastern Conference team above them in the standings for the first time on the year, was postponed following two confirmed cases of COVID-19 among Columbus staff: the third MLS match of the week forced into a postponement. It was later rescheduled for November 4. Orlando acquired winger Alexander Alvarado on loan from Ecuadorian club Aucas on October 13, trading for an additional international roster slot from Montreal Impact in order to add him to the roster. On October 14, Orlando drew 1–1 with New York City FC. The result kept Orlando in fourth place in both the Eastern Conference and Supporters' Shield standings. Homegrown midfielder Jordan Bender made his senior debut for the club as a substitute during the match. Despite conceding a 90+5-minute equalizer in a 1–1 draw with New York Red Bulls earlier in the evening, Orlando City's first MLS playoff berth in club history was confirmed on October 18 with a combination of the tie and Toronto FC later beating Atlanta United 1–0 thanks to an 89th-minute winner by Pablo Piatti. The club record unbeaten streak ended at 12 matches on October 24 as Orlando lost to Inter Miami CF, the last team to have beaten the Lions prior to the start of the streak on August 22. This time the score was 2–1 with Leandro González Pírez scoring a 90th-minute winner for the expansion side. August transfer Matheus Aiás made his club debut in the game as a stoppage time substitute. Orlando's final game of October was a 4–1 win over Atlanta, the fourth meeting between the two teams on the season with the Lions remaining unbeaten in the series. It marked the first time Orlando beat Atlanta at home. Loanee Alexander Alvarado made his club debut in the game as a 79th-minute substitute while Matheus Aiás scored his first goal for Orlando.

November
Orlando earned their first regular season shutout win of the season on November 1, beating Montreal Impact 1–0 at the Canadian side's temporary designated home stadium Red Bull Arena, a repeat of the scoreline when the team's met in the MLS is Back Tournament round of 16. Dike's seventh goal of the season proved the difference and took him level with Nani as the team's second-highest goalscorer on the season. On November 5, Orlando finally played the rescheduled game against Columbus Crew - the teams entered the game level on points with Columbus ahead in third on the number of wins tiebreaker. Orlando dominated the first half and led at half-time as Chris Mueller hit double figures for goals for the first time in his professional career. However, a seemingly innocuous foul was controversially upgraded to a red card after VAR review which saw Nani sent off in the 52nd minute. The red card was rescinded by the Independent Review Panel on November 7. Columbus capitalized on the swing in momentum, Harrison Afful scoring an equalizer four minutes later. Despite the numerical disadvantage, Orlando weathered the storm and found a winning goal in the 84th minute through Benji Michel. The victory guaranteed Orlando a top-four finish in the Eastern Conference and home field advantage in the first round of the playoffs as a result.

Decision Day
Having moved up to third place in the Eastern Conference with the victory over Columbus, Orlando just needed to avoid defeat against Nashville SC in the final game of the season to retain the #3 seed for the playoffs. The Lions, who were unbeaten at home on the season coming into the game, took the lead early in the first half through Dike but were pegged back and went into half-time tied at 1–1. Having re-established the lead with a Nani freekick on the hour mark, Nashville turned the game around late on with goals in the 88th and 90+3rd minute to win 3–2, handing Orlando their only home loss of the regular season. Orlando dropped down to the #4 seed on the total wins tiebreaker, finishing level on points with Columbus following the Crew's win over Atlanta.

Playoffs
Having finished in fourth-place in the Eastern Conference, Orlando City were positioned to play #5 seed New York City FC in the first round of the playoffs on November 21 having avoided the play-in round and clinched home-field advantage for the first round. Orlando took an early lead in the 5th minute through a Nani penalty but New York responded within three minutes, equalizing through a Maxime Chanot header. Despite the franctic pace to the game, it remained 1–1. Tensions boiled over in the 87th minute when Ruan, having been pushed by Gary Mackay-Steven while on the ground, lashed out and kicked at Mackay-Steven resulting in a red card. Despite the numerical disadvantage during extra-time, Orlando held on to take the game to a penalty shootout. Goalkeeper Gallese made a stop on Maximiliano Moralez's opener and thought he had made the winning save on New York's fifth attempt after Orlando had successfully converted all of their first four. However a VAR review deemed Gallese had left his goal line early which resulted in his second yellow card having been booked in extra-time for time wasting. Unable to make a substitution in a shootout, on loan defender Rodrigo Schlegel volunteered to finish the shootout as an emergency goalkeeper. With Nani's penalty saved by Sean Johnson to take the shootout into sudden death, Schlegel eventually made a decisive save on Guðmundur Þórarinsson teeing up Benji Michel to net the final penalty to lift Orlando to a 6–5 victory. Between the VAR review, the sending off, confusion around Orlando's attempt to substitute on backup goalkeeper Brian Rowe and the referee mistakenly signaling the end of the shootout following Schlegel's save with the scores level at 5–5, the shootout took 22 minutes to complete. As a result of the debacle, which gained international attention, MLS suspended referee Allen Chapman and the rest of the officiating crew for the remainder of the playoffs. Orlando's season was ended by #8 seed New England Revolution on November 29, a 3–1 conference semi-final defeat compounded by yet another red card for an Orlando player, this time Pereyra. New England jumped out to a two-goal lead through a Carles Gil penalty and Gustavo Bou strike. Urso halved the deficit before half-time but Orlando, who played down a man from the 60th minute onwards, couldn't find an equalizer and even saw a Nani penalty saved before the Revs eventually found a third goal in the 86th minute to kill off any hopes of a late Orlando comeback.

Roster 

 Last updated on October 13, 2020

Staff

Competitions

Friendlies
Orlando City reported for the start of preseason at their new training facility on January 20 before a closed-door friendly against Stetson University five days later. The team traveled to Cancún, Mexico, for a nine-day training camp beginning January 27 that was supposed to feature games against Columbus Crew and third-tier Mexican team Inter Playa although Columbus later pulled out. The team returned to Orlando for further friendlies against Montreal Impact, Tampa Bay Rowdies, D.C. United, reigning Icelandic champions KR Reykjavík and San Antonio FC with both the Montreal and KR games open to the public at Exploria Stadium. The KR match was the first time since the 2016 game against Bahia that Orlando had hosted foreign opposition in preseason.

Major League Soccer 

 All times in regular season on Eastern Daylight Time (UTC-04:00) except where otherwise noted.

Outside of the club, Inter Miami CF and Nashville SC joined the league as expansion franchises, bringing the total number of MLS clubs to 26. Orlando were due to play Miami for the first time at home on July 10 with the away tie on August 20. Because Nashville were placed in the Western Conference the teams were only scheduled meet once in regular-season league play in 2020, in Orlando on September 12. Nashville were ultimately relocated to the Eastern Conference ahead of the MLS is Back Tournament for the remainder of season.

Per the original 34-game schedule, it meant that for the first time Orlando would not play every team in MLS. They were still scheduled to play every Eastern Conference opponent both home and away, and all but three Western Conference opponents once. The three teams Orlando were not scheduled face in regular-season league play in 2020 were Los Angeles FC, San Jose Earthquakes and Seattle Sounders FC.

Results summary

Results
Regular schedule

MLS is Back Tournament

The three group stage matches at the MLS is Back Tournament counted towards the MLS regular season standings.

Phase 1 schedule

With the season disrupted by the COVID-19 pandemic two games in, Orlando did not return to in-market play until August 22 with a six-game home and away series against Inter Miami, Nashville SC and Atlanta United.

Rest of season schedule

Standings 

Eastern Conference table

Overall table

MLS Cup Playoffs

MLS is Back Tournament 

A one-off World Cup style tournament featuring all 26 MLS teams (later reduced to 24), the MLS is Back Tournament consisted of six groups with each team playing three group matches. The top two teams from each group along with the four best third-place teams moved on to the knockout stage, beginning with the round of 16. The draw for the group stage took place on June 11 with Orlando City placed as the top seed A1 in Group A as the designated host. Inter Miami CF were predetermined as A2 prior to the draw taking place in order to make the first meeting between the two teams the tournament opener. New York City FC and Nashville SC were randomly drawn as the two other group stage opponents. Nashville later withdrew from the tournament after nine players tested positive for COVID-19. Philadelphia Union replaced them as Orlando's final group stage opponent. Points collected during the group stage were counted towards the 2020 regular season standings.

Group stage

Knockout Stage

U.S. Open Cup 

Following a restructuring to the competition, Orlando City became one of 11 MLS teams subject to entry in the third round of the U.S. Open Cup instead of the fourth round because they did not finish as a top 12 US-based team in the previous MLS season. The draw for the third round was scheduled take place on April 10, 2020. On August 17, 2020, the United States Soccer Federation announced the cancelation of the U.S. Open Cup as a result of the coronavirus pandemic, the first time the tournament had not been played since its inception in 1914.

Squad statistics

Appearances 

Starting appearances are listed first, followed by substitute appearances after the + symbol where applicable.

|-
! colspan=12 style=background:#dcdcdc; text-align:center|Goalkeepers

|-
! colspan=12 style=background:#dcdcdc; text-align:center|Defenders

|-
! colspan=12 style=background:#dcdcdc; text-align:center|Midfielders

|-
! colspan=12 style=background:#dcdcdc; text-align:center|Forwards

|-
|colspan="12"|Players away from the club on loan:

|}

Goalscorers

Shutouts

Disciplinary record

Player movement 
Per Major League Soccer and club policies, terms of the deals do not get disclosed.

MLS SuperDraft picks 
Draft picks are not automatically signed to the team roster. The 2020 MLS SuperDraft was held in January 2020. Orlando had six selections, making five before electing to pass in the fourth round.

Transfers in

Loans in

Transfers out

Loans out

References 

Orlando City SC seasons
Orlando City
Orlando City
Orlando City